Dover House is a Grade I-listed mansion in Whitehall, and the London headquarters of the Office of the Secretary of State for Scotland.

The building also houses the Office of the Advocate General for Scotland and the Independent Commission for Aid Impact.

History
Dover House was designed by James Paine as the London townhouse of  Sir Matthew Fetherstonhaugh, Bart., MP, in the 1750s. It was remodelled by Henry Flitcroft, as "Montagu House", for George Montagu, created 1st Duke of Montagu, who had moved from nearby Bloomsbury. It was refurbished once again, by Henry Holland for the Prince Frederick, Duke of York, from 1788 to 1792. The building belonged to the Melbourne family from 1793 to 1830.

It has also been home to a French ambassador and Lady Caroline Lamb, with whom the Romantic poet Lord Byron famously had an affair. Its most notable feature is an entrance hall in the form of a rotunda inserted into the former forecourt by Holland, which is a unique entrance to a London mansion. The last private owners were the family of the Whig politician George James Welbore Agar-Ellis, created (1831) Baron Dover, whose title it has retained.

Government use
The Agar-Ellis heirs owned Dover House from 1830 to 1885, when it became the Scottish Office, the UK government department responsible for Scottish affairs.

Although mostly used for the Scottish Office, this building was used by the Colonial Office for several years from 1941 onwards. In 1946 the Glasgow Herald speculated that "It will not be many years before the building will be put to demolition and new Government offices raised on the site." It was still in use by the Colonial Office when Zionist terrorists planted a bomb there in April 1947.

When Scotland acquired a devolved parliament, the responsibilities of the Scottish Office were reduced and, in 1999, was renamed the Scotland Office with Dover House remaining as its chief London building. The Scotland Office also has a Scottish headquarters, on Melville Crescent in Edinburgh's New Town.

The Independent Commission for Aid Impact is also based at Dover House.

References

Bibliography

External links

Dover House entry from The DiCamillo Database of British & Irish Country Houses
Dover House page from the Survey of London

Houses in the City of Westminster
National government buildings in London
Grade I listed houses in London
Grade I listed buildings in the City of Westminster
1750s establishments in England
Georgian architecture in the City of Westminster
Greek Revival houses in the United Kingdom
Neoclassical architecture in London